Johan Mohr Faye (16 May 1889 – 16 September 1974) was a Norwegian architect and sailor who competed in the 1920 Summer Olympics. He was a crew member of the Norwegian boat Fornebo, which won the silver medal in the 7 metre class.

His uncle, Johan Faye, designed the Kristofer Lehmkuhls hus in 1881, which houses the Institutt for administrasjon og organisasjonsvitenskap (Department of Administration and Organization Theory) at the University of Bergen.

See also
 Egill Reimers

References

External links 
 
 

1889 births
1975 deaths
Norwegian male sailors (sport)
Sailors at the 1920 Summer Olympics – 7 Metre
Olympic sailors of Norway
Olympic silver medalists for Norway
Olympic medalists in sailing
Medalists at the 1920 Summer Olympics